A leadership election was held in the Liberal Democratic Party of Japan on 23 September 2007 after the incumbent party leader and Prime Minister of Japan Shinzō Abe announced that he would resign on 12 September 2007. Abe had only been elected to the post slightly less than a year earlier; his resignation came only three days after a new parliamentary session had begun. Abe said his unpopularity was hindering the passage of an anti-terrorism law, involving among other things Japan's continued military presence in Afghanistan. Party officials also said the embattled Prime Minister was suffering from poor health.

Fukuda defeated Asō in the election, receiving 330 votes against 197 votes for Asō.

Since the LDP had an absolute majority in the lower house, Fukuda became Prime Minister on 25 September 2007. His principal rival, Tarō Asō, later succeeded him as prime minister after Fukuda's resignation in September 2008.

Candidates
Endorsement by at least twenty LDP lawmakers is necessary to become a candidate in the election. Since there are 387 LDP Diet members and 141 prefectural LDP representatives (three for each of the 47 prefectural chapters), there is a total of 528 votes. The following people were candidates in the election:

 Taro Aso, LDP Secretary General; came in second to Abe in the 2006 leadership election and was initially rumored to be the most likely successor before Fukuda gathered support. He announced his candidacy on 13 September 2007.
 Yasuo Fukuda, former Chief Cabinet Secretary under Yoshiro Mori and Junichiro Koizumi. He announced his candidacy on 15 September 2007.

People who were considered likely candidates, but refused to seek the nomination, were:
 Former Prime Minister Junichiro Koizumi, Abe's immediate predecessor, was also considered a possible candidate, but declined to seek the nomination. He expressed his support for Fukuda on 14 September 2007.
 The incumbent Minister of Finance Fukushiro Nukaga initially stated on 13 September 2007 he would run, but decided to support Fukuda on 14 September 2007 after he had a 40-minute meeting with him. 
 Sadakazu Tanigaki, a former Minister of Finance under Junichiro Koizumi, and Taku Yamasaki, a former LDP Secretary General and the third candidate in the 2006 leadership election, both announced their support for Fukuda on 14 September 2007, as did former LDP Secretary General Makoto Koga.
 Kaoru Yosano, the incumbent Chief Cabinet Secretary, was also considered a likely candidate, but did not stand.

Aso conceded on 16 September 2007 that he was unlikely to win the race and stated he was primarily continuing as a candidate to give party members a choice. Fukuda had by that date gathered the official support of eight factions of the LDP, all except Aso's own faction; he furthermore stated he would not visit the controversial Yasukuni Shrine, and proposed the construction of a secular national memorial facility instead. Aso stated that there could be no replacement for the shrine, but did not state whether he would visit the shrine if elected. Fukuda struck a more conciliatory tone in relation to the North Korean abduction issue, while Aso positioned himself as a hardliner.

According to media surveys, Fukuda had 213 of the lawmakers on his side, while Aso had the assured support of 45 Diet members.  Observers agreed that Fukuda was almost certain to win due to the widespread support across faction borders he had obtained.

Fukuda received 330 votes in the election, held on 23 September, defeating Asō, who received 197 votes.  The support from Diet members alone was enough for Fukuda to win the leadership in the first round.

Results

 1 invalid vote

References

2007 elections in Japan
Political party leadership elections in Japan
Liberal Democratic Party (Japan)
Indirect elections
September 2007 events in Japan
Liberal Democratic Party (Japan) leadership election